Phyllonorycter viburnella is a moth of the family Gracillariidae. It is known from Québec in Canada and Connecticut and Ohio in the United States.

The larvae feed on Viburnum species, including Viburnum dentatum and Viburnum recognitum. They mine the leaves of their host plant. The mine has an elongate form occupying the space between two veins. The wrinkling of the lower epidermis almost brings the veins together

References

viburnella
Moths of North America
Moths described in 1923